Richard Poore (died 1237) was an English clergyman.

Richard Poore may also refer to:
Sir Richard Poore, 4th Baronet (1853–1930), British naval officer
Richard B. Poore (born 1965), New Zealand television manager